The Konica Minolta Maxxum 5D (its North American market name; labelled Dynax 5D in Europe/Hong Kong and α-5 Digital and α Sweet Digital in Japan; officially named DG-5D) was a digital single-lens reflex camera introduced by Konica Minolta in 2005.

The camera has a sensor-shifting image stabilization feature inherited from the Konica Minolta Maxxum 7D.

See also
First frame black ( "Error 58")

References

External links

5
Digital cameras with CCD image sensor